The death of Caesar refers to the assassination of Roman dictator Julius Caesar in 44 BCE.

Death of Caesar or Death of Julius Caesar may also refer to:

 Deaths of Caesars (Roman emperors), see  List of Roman emperors

Death of Caesar
The Death of Caesar may also refer to:

 The Death of Caesar (Gérôme), an 1867 painting by the French artist Jean-Léon Gérôme
 The death of Caesar (Jackson), an 1865 painting by British artist Frederick Hamilton Jackson
 The death of Caesar (Janssens), a 17th/18th-century painting by Flemish artist Victor Honoré Janssens
 The Death of Caesar (Klinger), a painting by Max Klinger

Death of Julius Caesar
The Death of Julius Caesar may refer to:

 The Death of Julius Caesar (Camuccini), an 1806 painting by Vincenzo Camuccini

See also
 Assassination of Julius Caesar (disambiguation)
 La morte di Cesare, an 18th-century opera in three acts by Francesco Bianchi
 Julius Caesar (disambiguation)
 Caesar (disambiguation)